Zirikovo (Yerek) is a rural locality (a village) in Burlinsky Selsoviet, Gafuriysky District, Bashkortostan, Russia. The population was 161 as of 2010. There are 4 streets.

Geography 
Zirikovo is located 38 km north of Krasnousolsky (the district's administrative centre) by road. Yavgildy is the nearest rural locality.

References 

Rural localities in Gafuriysky District